Paso de Carrasco or Paso Carrasco is a city in the Canelones Department of Uruguay. 

Paso Carrasco is also the name of the municipality to which the city belongs and which includes also Barra de Carrasco and the area of the International Airport.

Geography

Location
The city is located on Route 106 (Camino Carrasco), east of the  stream Arroyo Carrasco. Across this stream it borders the Montevideo Department, to the southeast it borders the Ciudad de la Costa, while to the northeast is the Carrasco International Airport.

History
On 15 October 1963 its status was elevated to "Pueblo" (village) by the Act of Ley Nº 13.167. On 19 October 1994, its status was further elevated to "Ciudad" (city) by the Act of  Ley Nº 16.608.

Population
According to the 2011 census, Paso Carrasco had a population of 15,908. In 2010, the Intendencia de Canelones had estimated a population of 19,775 for the municipality during the elections. The official site of the Intendencia de Canelones states now a population of 22,688 for the municipality.
 
Source: Instituto Nacional de Estadística de Uruguay

Places of worship
 Parish Church of St. Joseph the Worker (Roman Catholic)

References

External links
INE map of Colonia Nicolich, Paso Carrasco, Carrasco Int.Airport, and parts of the municipality of Ciudad de la Costa

Populated places in the Canelones Department